A catch-22 is a paradoxical situation from which an individual cannot escape because of contradictory rules or limitations. The term was coined by Joseph Heller, who used it in his 1961 novel Catch-22.

Catch-22s often result from rules, regulations, or procedures that an individual is subject to, but has no control over, because to fight the rule is to accept it. Another example is a situation in which someone is in need of something that can only be had by not being in need of it (e.g. the only way to qualify for a loan is to prove to the bank that you do not need a loan). One connotation of the term is that the creators of the "catch-22" situation have created arbitrary rules in order to justify and conceal their own abuse of power.

Origin and meaning 
Joseph Heller coined the term in his 1961 novel Catch-22, which describes absurd bureaucratic constraints on soldiers in World War II. The term is introduced by the character Doc Daneeka, an army psychiatrist who invokes "Catch-22" to explain why any pilot requesting mental evaluation for insanity—hoping to be found not sane enough to fly and thereby escape dangerous missions—demonstrates his own sanity in creating the request and thus cannot be declared insane. This phrase also means a dilemma or difficult circumstance from which there is no escape because of mutually conflicting or dependent conditions.

Different formulations of "Catch-22" appear throughout the novel. The term is applied to various loopholes and quirks of the military system, always with the implication that rules are inaccessible to and slanted against those lower in the hierarchy. In chapter 6, Yossarian (the protagonist) is told that Catch-22 requires him to do anything his commanding officer tells him to do, regardless of whether these orders contradict orders from the officer's superiors.

In a final episode, Catch-22 is described to Yossarian by an old woman recounting an act of violence by soldiers:

According to literature professor Ian Gregson, the old woman's narrative defines "Catch-22" more directly as the "brutal operation of power", stripping away the "bogus sophistication" of the earlier scenarios.

Other appearances in the novel 
Besides referring to an unsolvable logical dilemma, Catch-22 is invoked to explain or justify the military bureaucracy. For example, in the first chapter, it requires Yossarian to sign his name to letters that he censors while he is confined to a hospital bed. One clause mentioned in chapter 10 closes a loophole in promotions, which one private had been exploiting to reattain the attractive rank of private first class after any promotion. Through courts-martial for going AWOL, he would be busted in rank back to private, but Catch-22 limited the number of times he could do this before being sent to the stockade.

At another point in the book, a prostitute explains to Yossarian that she cannot marry him because he is crazy, and she will never marry a crazy man. She considers any man crazy who would marry a woman who is not a virgin. This closed logic loop clearly illustrated Catch-22 because by her logic, all men who refuse to marry her are sane and thus she would consider marriage; but as soon as a man agrees to marry her, he becomes crazy for wanting to marry a non-virgin, and is instantly rejected.

At one point, Captain Black attempts to press Milo into depriving Major Major of food as a consequence of not signing a loyalty oath that Major Major was never given an opportunity to sign in the first place. Captain Black asks Milo, "You're not against Catch-22, are you?"

In chapter 40, Catch-22 forces Colonels Korn and Cathcart to promote Yossarian to Major and ground him rather than simply sending him home. They fear that if they do not, others will refuse to fly, just as Yossarian did.

Significance of the number 22 

Heller originally wanted to call the phrase (and hence, the book) by other numbers, but he and his publishers eventually settled on 22. The number has no particular significance; it was chosen more or less for euphony. The title was originally Catch-18, but Heller changed it after the popular Mila 18 was published a short time beforehand.

Usage 
The term "catch-22" has filtered into common usage in the English language. In a 1975 interview, Heller said the term would not translate well into other languages.

James E. Combs and Dan D. Nimmo suggest that the idea of a "catch-22" has gained popular currency because so many people in modern society are exposed to frustrating bureaucratic logic. They write:

Everyone, then, who deals with organizations understands the bureaucratic logic of Catch-22. In high school or college, for example, students can participate in student government, a form of self-government and democracy that allows them to decide whatever they want, just so long as the principal or dean of students approves. This bogus democracy that can be overruled by arbitrary fiat is perhaps a citizen's first encounter with organizations that may profess 'open' and libertarian values, but in fact are closed and hierarchical systems. Catch-22 is an organizational assumption, an unwritten law of informal power that exempts the organization from responsibility and accountability, and puts the individual in the absurd position of being excepted for the convenience or unknown purposes of the organization.

Along with George Orwell's "doublethink", "catch-22" has become one of the best-recognized ways to describe the predicament of being trapped by contradictory rules.

A significant type of definition of alternative medicine has been termed a catch-22. In a 1998 editorial co-authored by Marcia Angell, a former editor of the New England Journal of Medicine, argued that:

It is time for the scientific community to stop giving alternative medicine a free ride. There cannot be two kinds of medicine – conventional and alternative. There is only medicine that has been adequately tested and medicine that has not, medicine that works and medicine that may or may not work. Once a treatment has been tested rigorously, it no longer matters whether it was considered alternative at the outset. If it is found to be reasonably safe and effective, it will be accepted. But assertions, speculation, and testimonials do not substitute for evidence. Alternative treatments should be subjected to scientific testing no less rigorous than that required for conventional treatments.

This definition has been described by Robert L. Park as a logical catch-22 which ensures that any complementary and alternative medicine (CAM) method which is proven to work "would no longer be CAM, it would simply be medicine."

Logic 
The archetypal catch-22, as formulated by Joseph Heller, involves the case of John Yossarian, a U.S. Army Air Forces bombardier, who wishes to be grounded from combat flight. This will only happen if he is evaluated by the squadron's flight surgeon and found "unfit to fly". "Unfit" would be any pilot who is willing to fly such dangerous missions, as one would have to be mad to volunteer for possible death. However, to be evaluated, he must request the evaluation, an act that is considered sufficient proof for being declared sane. These conditions make it impossible to be declared "unfit".

The "Catch-22" is that "anyone who wants to get out of combat duty isn't really crazy". Hence, pilots who request a mental fitness evaluation are sane, and therefore must fly in combat. At the same time, if an evaluation is not requested by the pilot, he will never receive one and thus can never be found insane, meaning he must also fly in combat.

Therefore, Catch-22 ensures that no pilot can ever be grounded for being insane even if he is.

A logical formulation of this situation is:

The philosopher Laurence Goldstein argues that the "airman's dilemma" is logically not even a condition that is true under no circumstances; it is a "vacuous biconditional" that is ultimately meaningless. Goldstein writes:

See also 

 Begging the question
 Circular reasoning
 Cornelian dilemma 
 Deadlock
 Double bind
 False dilemma
 Feedback loop
 Hobson's choice – taking what is offered or taking nothing
 Ironic process theory
 Kobayashi Maru – a choice presented in Star Trek
 "The Lady, or the Tiger?" – a no-win situation
 List of paradoxes
 Morton's fork
 Mu 
 Ninety–ninety rule
 No-win situation
 Pyrrhic victory
 Self-reference
 Social trap
 Strange loop
 Vicious circle
 Wicked problem
 Zugzwang

References 

Catch-22
1961 neologisms
Dilemmas
Foundationalism
History of logic
Justification (epistemology)
Logic
Logical paradoxes
Metaphors referring to war and violence
Metaphors